The 1968 PGA Championship was the 50th PGA Championship played July 18–21 at Pecan Valley Golf Club in San Antonio, Texas. Julius Boros, age 48, won the third of his three major titles, one stroke ahead of runners-up Bob Charles and Arnold Palmer. Boros was the oldest winner of a major championship for over a half century, until Phil Mickelson won in the PGA Championship in 2021 at age fifty. The tournament was played in very hot conditions. Palmer had an  putt to tie on the 72nd green, but it missed on the high side of the hole. It was the second of his three runner-up finishes at the only major he never won; he also tied for second in 1964 and 1970.

This was the final major before the formation of the Tournament Players Division, later renamed the PGA Tour. The tour pros broke away from the PGA of America in August and formed an independent tour, the American Professional Golfers, Inc. (APG). A compromise was reached in December which brought the tournament players back to the PGA in a separate division with its own policy board and commissioner.

In his seventh PGA Championship, Jack Nicklaus missed his first cut in the event by a stroke; five of his six previous finishes were in the top three, with a victory in 1963 in Dallas. He made the next nine cuts at the PGA Championship and won four more times (1971, 1973, 1975, 1980).

This PGA Championship was played immediately after the Open Championship in Scotland, the fifth time during the 1960s which the final two majors were played in consecutive weeks. This PGA Championship was also the last held in July (until 2016); it moved to August in 1969 (except 1971 when it was played in February in Florida).

Past champions in the field

Made the cut

Missed the cut

Source:

Round summaries

First round
Thursday, July 18, 1968

Source:

Second round
Friday, July 19, 1968

Source:

Third round
Saturday, July 20, 1968

Source:

Final round
Sunday, July 21, 1968

Source:

References

External links
PGA Media Guide 2012
PGA.com – 1968 PGA Championship

PGA Championship
Golf in Texas
Sports competitions in San Antonio
PGA Championship
PGA Championship
PGA Championship
PGA Championship